Elk Prairie Township is one of sixteen townships in Jefferson County, Illinois, USA.  As of the 2010 census, its population was 725 and it contained 350 housing units.

Geography
The township is centered at 38°10'N 88°59'W (38.170,-88.987).

Cities, towns, villages
 Nason
 Waltonville (southeast quarter)

Unincorporated towns
 Dareville at 
(This list is based on USGS data and may include former settlements.)

Extinct towns
 Fitzgerrell at 
(These towns are listed as "historical" by the USGS.)

Adjacent townships
 McClellan Township (north)
 Dodds Township (northeast)
 Spring Garden Township (east)
 Ewing Township, Franklin County (southeast)
 Barren Township, Franklin County (south)
 Goode Township, Franklin County (southwest)
 Bald Hill Township (west)
 Blissville Township (northwest)

Cemeteries
The township contains these four cemeteries: Abner, Clampet, Mason and Old Baptist.

Major highways
  Illinois Route 148

Demographics

School districts
 Waltonville Community Unit School District 1

Political districts
 Illinois' 19th congressional district
 State House District 107
 State Senate District 54

References
 
 United States Census Bureau 2007 TIGER/Line Shapefiles
 United States National Atlas

External links
 City-Data.com
 Illinois State Archives

Townships in Jefferson County, Illinois
Mount Vernon, Illinois micropolitan area
Townships in Illinois